Floride Elizabeth Clemson (December 29, 1842 – July 23, 1871) was the daughter of Clemson University founder Thomas Green Clemson, and the granddaughter of former Vice President John C. Calhoun and his wife, Floride Calhoun. Clemson was most acknowledged for her diary that took place during and after the Civil War. Her diary states her journey to South Carolina by multiple forms of transportation in just a little under two weeks.

Personal life 
Floride married Gideon Lee III (1824–1894), son of New York governor Gideon Lee. They had one daughter, Floride Isabella Lee.

Floride Elizabeth died of tuberculosis at their home Leeside in Carmel, New York, on July 23, 1871.

Diary
Floride's diary was published as A Rebel Came Home. It was edited by Charles M. McGee and Ernest M. Lander, Jr. In the book, it states that McGee spent two summers in the Clemson Archives, where he came across Floride's diary and became interested in it. Also he worked with Lander and had the convenience of the artist being close by, which helped with the writing of the book.

References

19th-century American writers
American diarists
People from South Carolina
1842 births
1871 deaths
American women non-fiction writers
19th-century American women writers
Women diarists
19th-century diarists